Hat Head is a coastal town on the mid-northern coast of New South Wales, 459 kilometres north of Sydney, Australia, and in the Hat Head National Park.  At the time of the 2011 census, Hat Head had a population of 326 people.

Straight Street is the main street and is below sea level; however it has been many years since any flood activity invaded the village. A flood gate has effectively halted any freshwater flowing along Korogoro Creek from its source at the Swan Pool wetland, to its mouth at Hat Head. As a result, the creek suffers increasingly from sedimentation and will benefit from periodic opening of the installed floodgates during small flood events.

Part of the Kempsey Shire, Hat Head is a semi-isolated coastal location. It is predominantly a fishing village and tourist fishing resort. Approximately 350 permanent residents live on sand-based land mass surrounded by a national park and water — little, if any, land remains for new building — and property values are as much as fourfold higher compared to the balance of Kempsey Shire. It is a much sought-after location providing unique residential conditions.

Hat Head has good community facilities such as a library with internet access as part of the Nicholl Community Centre, a tiny church, tennis courts, covered children's playground, and disabled access to a beach viewing platform.

Due to a lack of road access, the area only started to be developed in the first part of the 20th century. Some early photographs show building and leisure activities - see: http://www.pictureaustralia.org/apps/pictureaustralia?action=PASearch&mode=subject&complete1=true&attribute1=subject&term1=Hat+Head+%28

References

 

Towns in New South Wales
Mid North Coast
Coastal towns in New South Wales